Sir Alexander Grigor Jeans (1849–1924) was a British newspaper editor and proprietor, the founder and managing editor of the Liverpool Post and Mercury.

He married Ellen Gallon (d. 1889). They had children:
 Allan Jeans, editor of the Liverpool Daily Post
 Frank Alexander Gallon Jeans (1878-1933), surgeon and author
 Ronald Jeans (1887–1973), playwright with a career spanning nearly 50 years

References

English newspaper editors
English male journalists
1849 births
1924 deaths
Alexander